Christopher Orr or Chris Orr may refer to:

 Chris Orr (artist) (born 1943), English artist
 Chris Orr (American football) (born 1997), American football linebacker
 Christopher Orr (actor) (born 1974), American actor who appeared in D3: The Mighty Ducks
 Christopher Orr (artist) (born 1967), Scottish painter
 Christopher Orr (film critic) (born 1967), American film critic
 Chris Orr (rugby league) (born 1973), rugby league footballer
 Christopher Orr (skier) (fl. 1984), New Zealand Paralympian